From the Dust Returned is a fix-up fantasy novel by Ray Bradbury published in 2001. The novel is largely created from a series of short stories Bradbury wrote decades earlier, centering on a family of Illinois-based monsters and ghosts named the Elliotts. The six previously published stories originally appeared in the magazines The Saturday Evening Post, Mademoiselle and Weird Tales as well as Bradbury's earlier collections Dark Carnival and The Toynbee Convector. Two of the stories, "Homecoming" and "Uncle Einar", were also anthologized in The October Country. Three new short stories are included, as well as several chapters to help connect the stories.

The novel features a cover illustration by Charles Addams, originally created to accompany the publication of the first Elliott story, "Homecoming", in Mademoiselle in 1946. The Elliotts bear a strong resemblance to Addams' own Addams Family characters. Bradbury and Addams were friends. Bradbury once discussed collaborating with Addams on an Elliott Family history, although that project never came to fruition. In a 2001 interview, Bradbury states that Addams "went his way and created the Addams Family and I went my own way and created my family in this book."

Contents
 "The Beautiful One Is Here" (prologue)
 "The Town and the Place"
 "Anuba Arrives"
 "The High Attic"
 "The Sleeper and Her Dreams"
 "The Wandering Witch" (previously published as "The April Witch")
 "Whence Timothy?"
 "The House, the Spider, and the Child"
 "Mouse, Far-Traveling"
 "Homecoming" (previously published in Mademoiselle and The October Country)
 "West of October" (previously published in The Toynbee Convector)
 "Many Returns"
 "On the Orient North" (previously published in The Toynbee Convector)
 "Nostrum Paracelsius Crook"
 "The October People"
 "Uncle Einar" (previously published in Dark Carnival 1947 and The October Country)
 "The Whisperers"
 "The Theban Voice"
 "Make Haste to Live" (new)
 "The Chimney Sweeps"
 "The Traveler" (previously published in Weird Tales, 1945)
 "Return to the Dust" (new)
 "The One Who Remembers"
 "The Gift" (new)

Film 
In 2012, MGM acquired the rights to create a film adaptation of From the Dust Returned.

References

Bibliography

External links
 

Novels by Ray Bradbury
2001 American novels
American fantasy novels